Where Have All the People Gone? is a 1974 American made-for-television science fiction drama film starring Peter Graves, Kathleen Quinlan, George O'Hanlon, Jr. and Verna Bloom.

Plot
On a camping trip in the Sierra Nevada mountains in central California, Steven Anders and his two teenage children, Deborah and David, are exploring a cave when they experience an earthquake. After emerging, they hear from a ranch-hand who was outside that there was a bright solar flash prior to the earthquake. He soon falls ill and dies, whereupon his body turns to a powdery substance. As the family comes down from the mountain to the nearest town, they discover that everyone has turned to the powdery substance inside their clothing, and there are few survivors.

Owing to fear and anxiety, most people they find are focused only on their own survival, but as the family tries to make their way home to Malibu (where the mother had returned earlier from the camping trip), they find two people that need their help, as well as a man who invites them to be neighbors.

They face dangers ranging from wild dogs, who seem to have been driven mad from the solar flare, to a gunman who steals their car. They rescue a woman, Jenny, and later a young boy whose family was killed by two men who stole their car. Apart from the physical journey, they struggle to overcome the emotional trauma of the events.

They find their way home and discover a note left for them by the mother, who has also died and turned into a powdery substance. They are informed that a virus outbreak that began after the solar flare is responsible for most of the deaths, and that some people have a genetic resistance. Despairing, Jenny tries to commit suicide by drowning herself in the ocean, but she is rescued.  At the conclusion, they exude a hopeful outlook by embarking on a trek to northern California.

Cast
Peter Graves as Steven Anders 
Verna Bloom as Jenny 
Kathleen Quinlan as Deborah Anders 
George O'Hanlon, Jr. as David Anders 
Michael-James Wixted as Michael 
Noble Willingham as Jim Clancy 
Jay W. MacIntosh as Barbara Anders

Production

The film was made for NBC and directed by John L Moxey. The teleplay was written by Lewis John Carlino and Sandor Stern, from a story by Carlino. Starlog cited the movie as an intended TV pilot that was not picked up that was "better than many shows that ended up being made".

Reception

The website Moria found that while the movie was open-ended it found the movie's avoidance of the usual post-apocalyptic clichés to be a real plus. It also liked the mystery the movie presented and enjoyed the resolution, although its scientific validity was questionable. It noted the movie could have served as a pilot for an on-going TV series. The Encyclopedia of Science Fiction found the movie to be routine, with competent direction, and a few interesting twists. Apocalypse Movies liked it, calling it a rare TV movie to address post-apocalypse issues.

Home media
The film was released on region 1 DVD in 2011. As of June 2020, it was available to stream on YouTube

References

External links
 

1974 films
1974 television films
1970s science fiction films
NBC network original films
Films directed by John Llewellyn Moxey
Films scored by Robert Prince
Films about viral outbreaks
Films set in California
American post-apocalyptic films
Films with screenplays by Lewis John Carlino
1970s American films